Ruth Holmes may refer to:
 Ruth Langsford, also Holmes, Singapore-born English television presenter
 Ruth Atkinson Holmes, American painter and philanthropist
 Ruth Bradley Holmes, American linguist, educator, and polyglot